Francillon is a surname, and may refer to:

 Ernest Francillon (born 1834), founder and manager of Longines watch manufacturing company
 James Francillon (1802–1866), English barrister and legal writer
 John Francillon (1744–1816), English jeweller and naturalist
 Robert Edward Francillon (1841–1919), English journalist and author

See also
 Francillon, Indre, France
 Francillon was also the title of Alexandre Dumas, fils's last play.